Clavus fusconitens is a species of sea snail, a marine gastropod mollusk in the family Drilliidae.

Description
The length of the shell attains 15 mm, its diameter 6 mm. The glossy, dark-brown shell has a fusiform shape. The angularity, common to the genus Clavus, is scarcely apparent. The shell contains 8 slightly convex whorls and 8 longitudinal ribs. The aperture is oblong. The almost straight columella shows a small callus. The acute outer lip is produced. The siphonal canal is short and not very wide.

Distribution
This is a marine species occurs off the Philippines

References

External links

fusconitens
Gastropods described in 1901